Martensinus is a genus of Asian dwarf spiders that was first described by J. Wunderlich in 1973.  it contains only two species, both found in Nepal: M. annulatus and M. micronetiformis.

See also
 List of Linyphiidae species (I–P)

References

Araneomorphae genera
Linyphiidae
Spiders of Asia